Anteros acheus is a species of butterfly of the family Riodinidae, found in Brazil, Suriname and Bolivia. It was first described by Caspar Stoll in 1781.

Description
(Description of A. a. ampyx) Upperside: Antennae white, brown at their extremities. Thorax, abdomen, and wings brown; the anterior wings having two oval straw-coloured spots placed near the middle, and the anterior edges of the posterior ones streaked with the same colour.

Underside: Palpi, breast, legs, and abdomen straw coloured. Wings straw coloured, being spotted and streaked with red brown, each of these markings appearing to have a gold spot or streak in its centre, forming a very beautiful and singular appearance. Margins of the anterior wings entire, but of the posterior ones a little dentated. Wingspan  inches (44 mm).

Subspecies
 A. a. acheus (Suriname)
 A. a. ampyx (Drury, 1782) (Brazil: Rio de Janeiro)
 A. a. troas Stichel, 1909 (Bolivia)

References

Riodinidae
Riodinidae of South America
Butterflies described in 1781
Descriptions from Illustrations of Exotic Entomology
Taxa named by Caspar Stoll